The Cork Senior A Hurling Championship (known for sponsorship reasons as the Co-Op Superstores Cork Senior A Hurling Championship and abbreviated to the Cork SAHC) is an annual hurling competition organised by the Cork County Board of the Gaelic Athletic Associationfrom 2020 for the second tier hurling teams in the county of Cork in Ireland.

The series of games are played between the spring and autumn months, including a summer break, with the county final being played at Páirc Uí Chaoimh in October. The championship includes a round robin followed by a knockout stage.

Fr. O'Neill's are the reigning champions, having beaten Courcey Rovers by 0-20 to 2-12 in the 2022 final.

History

Development
On 26 March 2019, three championship proposals were circulated to Cork club delegates after an expensive review process of the entire Cork championship system. A core element running through all three proposals, put together by the Cork GAA games workgroup, was that there be a group stage of 12 teams, as well as straight relegation and promotion. On 2 April 2019, a majority of 136 club delegates voted for Option A which provided for one round of games played in April and two more in August – all with inter-county players available. The decision meant that, for the first time since 1887, the top tier of Cork football was going to be split in two into the Cork Premier Senior Championship and the Cork Senior A Championship.

Beginnings
The inaugural championship was scheduled to begin in April 2020, however, it was postponed indefinitely due to the coronavirus pandemic in Ireland. When the championship resumed, time constraints led to a revision of the format, with the play-offs for the second best and third best third placed teams being abolished. The knockout stage was further reduced, with the two best-ranking teams from the group stage receiving byes to the semi-finals and the other four qualifying teams contesting two lone quarter-finals. The very first match eventually took place on 31 July 2020, with Fr. O'Neill's claiming a 3-16 to 0-18 victory over Kilworth. Declan Dalton scored the very first championship point before Billy Dunne scored the championship's first ever goal. Kilworth became the first team to be relegated when they lost the 2020 relegation playoff to Killeagh.

Regular format

Group stage
The 12 teams are divided into three groups of four. Over the course of the group stage, which features one game in April and two games in August, each team plays once against the others in the group, resulting in each team being guaranteed at least three games. Two points are awarded for a win, one for a draw and zero for a loss. The teams are ranked in the group stage table by points gained, then scoring difference and then their head-to-head record. The top two teams in each group qualify for the knock-out stage.

Knockout stage
Play-off: The second best and third best third placed teams from the group stage play off for last quarter-final place.

Quarter-finals: The play-off winner and the seven top-ranking teams from the group stage contest this round. The four winners from these four games advance to the semi-finals.

Semi-finals: The four quarter-final winners contest this round. The two winners from these four games advance to the semi-finals.

Final: The two semi-final winners contest the final. The winning team are declared champions.

Promotion and relegation
At the end of the championship, the winning team is automatically promoted to the Cork Premier Senior Championship for the following season. The three bottom-placed teams from the group stage take part in a series of play-offs, with the losing team being relegated to the Cork Premier Intermediate Championship.

2023 Teams

Sponsorship
Co-Op Superstores were unveiled as the title sponsor for all of Cork GAA's hurling championships in July 2020.

Venues

Group stage

Fixtures in the group stage of the championship are usually played at a neutral venue that is deemed halfway between the participating teams. Some of the more common venues include Mallow GAA Complex, Páirc Uí Chonaill, Ballincollig Sportsfield and Coachford Pitch.

Final
The inaugural final in 2020 was played at Páirc Uí Chaoimh.

Managers
Managers in the Cork Senior A Championship are involved in the day-to-day running of the team, including the training, team selection, and sourcing of players. Their influence varies from club-to-club and is related to the individual club committees. The manager is assisted by a team of two or three selectors and a backroom team consisting of various coaches.

Trophy and medals
The Jim Forbes Cup is the current prize for winning the championship. It was commissioned to honour Jim Forbes who served in a number of administrative roles with the Cork County Board, including as Chairman from 2003 to 2005. The cup was presented to the County Board by the Carrigdhoun division shortly before the 2020 final.

In accordance with GAA rules, the County Board awards a set of gold medals to the championship winners. The medals depict a stylised version of the Cork GAA crest.

List of finals

Roll of honour

By Division

Records and statistics

Top scorers

All time

By year

In a single game

In finals

References

 
Hurling competitions in County Cork
Senior hurling county championships